WAO!! is the second album by Japanese ska band, Oreskaband, released on May 23, 2007. "WAO!!" stands for "We Are Oreskaband!!"

Track listing
 ピノキオ (Pinocchio)
 クーラーソサイエティ (Cooler Society)
 爪先 (Tiptoe;Tsumasaki)
 花のスカダンス (Hana no Ska Dance)
 川のぼり (Kawa no Bori)
 アーモンド (Almond)
 忘れもの(Things I've Forgotten; Wasuremono)
 U
 アスター (Aster) 
 Shall We Dance ?
 さよならデジャヴ (Good Bye Deja vu;Sayonara Deja Vu)
 ナイフとフォーク (Knife & Fork)
 チャック (Chuck)

2007 albums
Oreskaband albums